Switzer is an unincorporated community in Spartanburg County, in the U.S. state of South Carolina.

History
A post office called Switzer was established in 1886, and remained in operation until 1952. The community was named for the Switzer family, the original owners of the town site.

References

Unincorporated communities in Spartanburg County, South Carolina
Unincorporated communities in South Carolina